"Music Sounds Better with You" is the only song by the French house trio Stardust, released on 20 July 1998. Stardust comprised the producer Thomas Bangalter, the DJ Alan Braxe and the vocalist Benjamin Diamond. They constructed "Music Sounds Better With You", a dance track, from a guitar riff sampled from the 1981 Chaka Khan song "Fate".

"Music Sounds Better with You" was initially released on Bangalter's label Roulé, followed by a wider release on Virgin Records, accompanied by a music video directed by Michel Gondry. It debuted at number two on the UK Singles Chart in August 1998 and stayed there for two weeks, becoming one of the UK's bestselling singles that year. It also topped the US Billboard Dance Club Songs chart for two weeks. It is certified double platinum in the UK, platinum in Australia, gold in Belgium and silver in France. 

"Music Sounds Better with You" received positive reviews and has been named one of the greatest dance songs of all time by several publications. Stardust recorded further demos, but decided to disband, believing this created "a certain magic and mystery".

Recording
In the mid-1990s, the DJ Alan Braxe met Thomas Bangalter of Daft Punk and gave him a demo of his track "Vertigo". Bangalter released the track on his label Roulé in 1997. After the launch, Braxe performed at the Rex Club in Paris, with Bangalter on keyboards and Braxe's friend Benjamin Diamond on vocals. They composed the first version of "Music Sounds Better with You" for the performance, using a looped sample from the 1981 Chaka Khan song "Fate", sampled using an E-mu SP-1200.

After the performance, the trio worked on the track at Bangalter's home studio, Daft House. They added a bassline using a Korg Trident synthesiser, drums with a Roland TR-909 drum machine, and Rhodes piano. They assembled the instrumental using an Ensoniq ASR-10 sampling keyboard, triggering different sections by assigning them to different keys. Diamond's vocals and the final track were compressed with an Alesis 3630.

The lyrics were written by all three members; the song initially had more lines, which were deleted. Diamond felt the sparse lyrics were "like a mantra ... something everyone could understand". Braxe recalled the trio listening to the finished song: "We were very happy because we felt like we achieved something original and quite new in its form."

Release
"Music Sounds Better with You" was released as a vinyl single on Bangalter's label Roulé in early 1998. According to Braxe, the song initially confused Paris clubgoers: "It didn't take a long time for people to understand the structure of the track and start to dance on it, but the very first listen the reaction was, 'What is it?'" The single was intended for DJs, but demand grew after copies were distributed at the 1998 Miami Winter Music Conference. According to the Roulé co-manager Gildas Loaec, the BBC Radio 1 DJ Pete Tong was the first radio DJ to play the song. Loaec and Diamond said "Music Sounds Better with You" sold between 250,000 and 400,000 copies on Roulé. Bangalter did not enjoy the pressure and attention the single brought, as Roulé was "supposed to be a hobby, a creative platform". 

Stardust signed the single to Virgin Records, which sold more than two million copies worldwide on vinyl and CD. Virgin released the song as a CD and cassette single in the UK on 10 August 1998. In the US, it was serviced to rhythmic contemporary and contemporary hit radio on 15 September 1998, followed by a commercial release on 22 September. It topped the Billboard Dance Club Songs chart for two weeks and reached number 62 on the Billboard Hot 100. In Canada, where a CD single was issued on 6 October 1998, it reached number two on the Canadian Singles Chart and number five on the RPM Dance chart. It topped the charts in Greece and Spain and reached the top 10 in at least nine other countries. It is certified double platinum in the UK, platinum in Australia, gold in Belgium and silver in France.

Music video
The "Music Sounds Better with You" music video was directed by Michel Gondry. In the video, a young boy constructs a model aeroplane over several days while the members of Stardust, wearing metallic suits with faces painted silver, perform on television. DJ Mag described the video as "charming" and "dreamy". The Insomniac journalist Jonny Coleman wrote that the video "helps reinforce the notion that this whole Stardust concept is supposed to exist in some other familiar but foreign liminal space, something ghostly but still warm and inviting".

Critical reception

John Bush from AllMusic described "Music Sounds Better with You" as "one of the most irresistible, sublime dance singles of the decade". Larry Flick of Billboard described it as a "euro-splashed ditty" with "an infectious li'l hook and a solid, old-school disco bassline ... its execution makes it pop with a refreshing energy". Another editor, Annabel Ross, called the song "sublime in its simplicity" and regarded it as one of the best dance songs of all time. Bruce Tantum from DJ Mag wrote that the song "doesn't do much of anything, really, nor does it have to. It exists in a state of pleasure-giving perfection."

In 2001, Mixmag named "Music Sounds Better with you" the 11th greatest dance song of all time, and in 2013 named it the sixth greatest. In 2018, Mixmag included it in their list of the 30-time "biggest vocal house anthems". Pitchfork ranked it the 46th best song of the 90s, and included it in The Pitchfork 500, a book compiling the greatest songs from 1977 to 2008. In 2011, Slant Magazine named it the 99th best single of the 90s, and 2012 Porcys ranked it the greatest. In 2017, BuzzFeed named it the 72nd greatest dance song of the 90s. In 2022, Pitchfork named "Music Sounds Better with You" one of the best house tracks of the 90s, while Rolling Stone named it the 73rd greatest dance song of all time.

Legacy
According to Billboard, after the success of "Music Sounds Better with You", Virgin offered Bangalter $3 million to produce a Stardust album. The group created five or six demos, but abandoned them. In 2012, Braxe said there were no plans to release the demos, saying it gave "Music Sounds Better with you" a "certain magic and mystery". Apart from their performance at Rex Club, Stardust performed only once, in a 30-minute set at the Borealis festival in Montpellier, France.

Diamond and Braxe resumed their solo careers; Diamond said he found it difficult to return to his own style of music after Stardust, and his record company Sony pressured him to release more music like "Music Sounds Better with You". Bangalter continued to release music as Daft Punk with his partner Guy-Manuel de Homem-Christo. Daft Punk performed a mashup of "Music Sounds Better with You" and their 2000 single "One More Time" on their 2006/2007 tour; a performance was included on the bonus disc of the live album Alive 2007. Pitchfork described it as "a combination so 'holy shit' ecstatic it would seem downright cocky if it wasn't so blissful".

In 2011, Big Time Rush sampled the song for their track "Music Sounds Better with U". It was also featured in the 2013 video game Grand Theft Auto V. In 2019, Stardust remastered the song for its 20th anniversary; it was reissued by the record label Because Music and added to streaming platforms.

Track listings

Personnel
Stardust
 Thomas Bangalter — guitar, production, songwriting, mixing
 Alan Braxe — production, songwriting, mixing
 Benjamin Diamond — vocals, songwriting

Additional musicians
 Dominic King — songwriting
 Frank Musker — songwriting
 Chaka Khan — sample

Charts

Weekly charts

Year-end charts

Sales and certifications

See also
 List of artists who reached number one on the U.S. dance chart

Notes

References

External links
 
 
 

1998 debut singles
1998 songs
Because Music singles
English-language French songs
House music songs
Music videos directed by Michel Gondry
Number-one singles in Greece
Number-one singles in Spain
Songs about music
Songs written by Frank Musker
Songs written by Thomas Bangalter
Virgin Records singles
Songs written by Dominic Bugatti